The Parrotspitze (in Italian, the Punta Parrot) (4,432 m) is a peak in the Pennine Alps of Italy and Switzerland. It is located south of Dufourspitze in the Monte Rosa Massif. The mountain is named after Johann Jakob Friedrich Wilhelm Parrot, a German doctor, who made an attempt on the Piramide Vincent with Joseph Zumstein in 1816.

The first ascent was made by Reginald S. Macdonald, Florence Crauford Grove, Montagu Woodmass and William Edward Hall with guides Melchior Anderegg and Peter Perren on 16 August 1863, four days after the same party's (with an extra guide) first ascent of the nearby Dent d'Hérens.

The previous year, on 8 July 1862, a party comprising A. W. Moore and Hereford Brooke George (the first editor of the Alpine Journal) with guides Christian Almer and Matthias Zumtaugwald climbed the east spur of the Parrotspitze (the British Route) but made straight over the frontier to Switzerland, not bothering to climb the final 60 metres to the summit.

See also

List of 4000 metre peaks of the Alps

References

 Dumler, Helmut and Willi P. Burkhardt, The High Mountains of the Alps, London: Diadem, 1994
 Collomb, Robin G., (ed.), Pennine Alps Central, London: Alpine Club, 1975

External links
 The Parrotspitze on SummitPost

Alpine four-thousanders
Mountains of the Alps
Mountains of Italy
Mountains of Valais
Pennine Alps
Italy–Switzerland border
International mountains of Europe
Monte Rosa
Mountains of Switzerland
Four-thousanders of Switzerland